The 319th Static Infantry Division (German 319. Infanterie-Division (bo.)) was a German Army static division during World War II. It was raised in November 1940 from units of the 87th, 169th and the 299th Infantry Divisions. On 30 April 1941 the 319th Division replaced the 216th Infantry Division in the Channel Islands defense and remained in that position until its capture in May 1945 by British forces.

Commanders
Generalleutnant Erich Müller (19 November 1940 – 1 September 1943)
Generalleutnant Rudolf Graf von Schmettow (1 September 1943 – 27 February 1945)
Generalmajor Rudolf Wulf (27 February 1945 – 8 May 1945)

Organization (1943–1945)

Command
582nd Grenadier Regiment
583rd Grenadier Regiment
584th Grenadier Regiment
319th Artillery Regiment
319th Engineer Battalion
319th Antitank Battalion
450th Fast Battalion
319th Signals Battalion
16th Machine Gun Battalion (attached)
213th Panzer Battalion (attached)
Army Coastal Artillery Regiment 1265 (attached)

See also
German occupation of the Channel Islands

References
319. Infanterie-Division German language article at www.lexikon-der-wehrmacht.de. Retrieved 4 August 2009.
Wendel, Marcus (2008). . Retrieved 22 January 2022.
Pipes, Jason. 319. Infanterie-Division on Feldgrau. Retrieved 4 August 2009.

Military units and formations established in 1940
Military units and formations disestablished in 1945
Infantry divisions of Germany during World War II